The title Tui Manuʻa was the title of the ruler or paramount chief of the Manuʻa Islands in present-day American Samoa.

The Tuʻi Manuʻa Confederacy, or Samoan Empire, are descriptions sometimes given to Samoan expansionism and projected hegemony in Oceania which began with the founding of the Tui Manu'a Title, Traditional oral literature of Samoa and Manu'a talks of a widespread Polynesian network or confederacy (or "empire")

History
The Tui Manu'a is the oldest title in Ancient Samoa. According to Samoan and Tongan oral histories, the first Tui Manu'a was a direct descendant of the Samoan supreme god, Tagaloa. In Samoan lore, the islands of Manu'a (Ofu, Olosega, and Ta'u) are always the first lands to be created or drawn from the sea; consequently the Tui Manu'a is the first human ruler mentioned. This "senior" ranking of the Tui Manu'a title continues to be esteemed and acknowledged by Samoans despite the fact that the title itself has not been occupied since the American takeover in the early 20th century.

The Tui Manu'a Confederacy
Traditional oral literature of Samoa and Tonga speaks of a widespread Polynesian network or confederacy (or "empire") that was prehistorically ruled by the successive Tui Manu'a dynasties. Manu'an genealogies and religious oral literature also suggest that the Tui Manu'a had long been one of the most prestigious and powerful paramounts of the Pacific and the first pre-eminent ruler of all Samoa. Oral history suggests that the Tui Manu'a kings did not rule anywhere in the pacific but Samoa  as well as smaller western Pacific chiefdoms and Polynesian outliers such as Uvea, Futuna, Tokelau, and Tuvalu. Commerce and exchange routes between the western Polynesian societies is well documented and it is speculated that the Tui Manu'a dynasty grew through its success in obtaining control over the oceanic trade of currency goods such as finely woven ceremonial mats, whale ivory "tabua", obsidian and basalt tools, chiefly red feathers, and seashells reserved for royalty (such as polished nautilus and the egg cowry).

Tonga

The Tui Manuʻa Empire's presence in Tonga was strongly felt upon. The Samoan invasion of Tonga occurred during the reign of Tui Manuʻa Tele Fitiaumua, when he waged to conquer Tonga by deploying 200 ʻalia boats capable of carrying at least 200 men per canoe. The Samoans first arrived in Vavaʻu at three villages. one boat at the village of Longomapu, one in Tuʻanekivale on the east end, and the third boat landing further inland at the village of Taʻanea. As they landed, they were met with the local Tongans, and which this also happens to be the first contact between Samoans and Tongans. The Samoans came with barring gifts from the king, with the finest fruits from Savaiʻi and ʻUpolu, and with the traditional fine mats woven by Samoans back home. A traditional ʻava ceremony was held by the Tongans to welcome the Samoans, as they came with the king's request of conquering Tonga and to swear allegiance to Tui Manuʻa. The Tongans accepted their request and submitted themselves to Samoan rule. The Samoans reputation spread across Tonga, with either uprising anger or welcoming attitude from the Tongans. A war occurred in Haʻapai between the invading Samoans and the defensive Tongans, where many warriors were slain on the island of Foa in Haʻapai. As the Samoans progressed through, their conquest of Haʻapai eventually was a success, and the Samoans came again with gifts. The Samoans proceeded to the main island of Tongatapu and ʻEua where the well known stand off battle of Samoans and Tongans occurred during the Samoan Empire's rule. Many Tongans gathered upon the villages of Nukunuku, Kolonga and Niutoua on Tongatapu, and at ʻOhonua on ʻEua. They saw their Samoan invaders in the distance and as they landed, a full scale war was seen. During the attack, the Tongans eventually submitted to Samoan rule and an ʻava ceremony was commenced with the purpose of the Tui Manuʻa's request being fulfilled. Through traditional Samoan custom, the ʻava ceremony was performed with the Tongans they had interacted with, showing their purpose of being in Tonga and the benefits the Tongans could have in the empire. The conquest of Tonga was finally complete with the last Tongan islands to submit to Tui Manuʻa.

During the reign of the Samoan Empire in Tonga, the status of Tongans within the empire was given great, with peace maintained between Samoans and Tongans. With Tui Manuʻa and Samoans often visiting Tonga and gifting Tongans with the finest fruits and food, ʻava roots, and traditional fine mats. Intermarriages between Samoans and Tongans were also common, with many Samoans residing in Tonga and raising families there, many Tongan women married Samoan warriors and left to Samoa to reside with their husbands. As to the same with Tongan men who married Samoan women and left to Samoa.

Decline and Isolation
Eventually, the maritime empire began to decline and a new empire rose from the South. In 950 AD, the first Tu'i Tonga 'Aho'eitu started to expand his rule outside of Tonga. Samoa's Savaii, Upolu and Tutuila islands were to eventually succumb to Tongan rule, and would remain part of the empire for almost 400 years. However, as the ancestral homeland of the Tu'i Tonga dynasty and the abode of deities such as Tagaloa 'Eitumatupu'a, Tonga Fusifonua, and Tavatavaimanuka, the Manu'a islands of Samoa were considered sacred by the early Tongan kings and thus were never occupied by the Tongans, allowing for it to remain under Tui Manu'a rule.

By the time of the tenth Tu’i Tonga Momo, and his successor, Tuʻitātui, the Tu'i Tonga's empire had grown to include much of the former domains of the Tui Fiti and Tui Manu'a. The expulsion of the Tongans in the 13th century from neighbouring Upolu and Savaii would not lead to the islands returning to Tui Manu'a but to the rise of a new dominant polity in the western isles: the Malietoa, whose feats in liberating Samoa from the Tongan occupants led to the establishment of a new political order in Upolu and Savaii which remained unchallenged for nearly 300 years. Although the Tui Manu'a would never again regain rulership of the surrounding islands, it is permanently held in high esteem as the progenitor of the great Samoan and Tongan lineages.

Colonization and the "Abolition" of the Tui Manu'a title
The Manu'a islands were grouped with Tutuila and Aunu'u as the United States possession now called American Samoa. The presidency of the United States, and the military authorities of the US Navy, supplanted the native administrative role of the Tui Manu'a, through the arrests of chiefs of the Tui Manu'a and two trials of the Tui Manu'a, one on an American warship off the coast of Ta'u, called the "Trial of the Ipu". On 6 July 1904 Tui Manu'a Elisala officially ceded the islands of Manu'a to the United States through the signing of the Treaty of Cession of Manu'a. He was relegated the office of Governor of Manu'a for the term of life and the understanding that the Tui Manu'a title would follow him to the grave. He died on 2 July 1909.

After a fifteen-year break, the office was revived in 1924 when Chris Young, a member of the Anoalo clan of the Tui Manu'a family and the brother of Tui Manu'a Matelita who reigned between 1890 and 1895, was named Tui Manu'a by the general assembly of the Faletolu and Anoalo. American officials were worried that the Manu'ans were restoring a "king" who would cause trouble for the administration. Governor Edward Stanley Kellogg opposed the bestowal and had the new Tui Manu'a brought to Tutuila where he was prevented from exercising the powers of his office. The Governor did not recognise the title on the basis that a monarchy was incompatible within the framework of the Constitution of the United States, stating that the previous Tui Manu'a had pledged under duress to be the last person to hold the title.

The descendants of Tui Manu'a are numerous.

List of Tui Manuʻa
Satiailemoa
Tele (brother of Satiailemoa)
Maui Tagote
Maugaotele
Folasa or Taeotagaloa
Faʻaeanuʻu I or Faʻatutupunuʻu
Saoʻioʻiomanu (Saʻo or eldest son of Faʻaeanuʻu I)
Saopuʻu (second son of Faʻaeanuʻu I)
Saoloa (third son of Faʻaeanuʻu I)
Tuʻufesoa (fourth son of Faʻaeanuʻu I)
Letupua (fifth son of Faʻaeanuʻu I)
Saofolau (sixth son of Faʻaeanuʻu I)
Saoluaga
Lelologatele (eldest son of Saofolau)
Aliʻimatua (eldest son of Lelologatele)
Aliʻitama (second son of Lelologatele)
Tui Oligo (grandson or son of Aliʻitama's daughter)
Faʻaeanuʻu II (eldest son of Tui Oligo)
Puipuipo (second son of Tui Oligo)
Siliʻaivao (third son of Tui Oligo)
Tuimanufili (daughter of Faʻaeanuʻu II)
Faʻatoʻalia Manu-o-le-faletolu (eldest son of Tuimanufili)
Segisegi (son of Faʻatoʻalia)
Siliave (daughter of Faʻatoʻalia)
Tui-o-Pomelea (son of Siliave)
Tui-o-Lite (or Tui Aitu) (son of Tui-o-Pomelea)
Toʻalepai (son of Tui-o-Lite)
Seuea (daughter of Toʻalepai)
Salofi (brother of Seuea)
Levaomana (son of Salofi)
Taliutafapule (son of Salofi and brother of Levaomana)
Taʻalolomana Muaatoa
Tupalo
Seiuli
Uʻuolelaoa (killed in a war with Fitiuta)
Fagaese
Tauveve
Visala
Alalamua
Matelita or Makelita (1872–1895), r. 1891–1895
Elisala or Elisara (died 1909), r. 1899–1909
Chris (Kilisi) Taliutafa Young (1924)

See also

Fa'amatai, chieflty system of Samoa.
Malietoa
Mata'afa
Tu'imaleali'ifano
Tupua Tamasese

References

Bibliography
 
McMullin, Dan Taulapapa. 2005. "The Passive Resistance of Samoans to US and Other Colonialisms", article in "Sovereignty Matters" , University of Nebraska Press.
 Office of the Governor. 2004. Manu'a ma Amerika. A brief historical documentary. Manu'a Centennial. 16 July 1904. 16 July 2004. Office of the Governor, American Samoa Government. 20 p.
 Samoa News 
 Linnekin, Hunt, Lang & McCormick (University of Hawaii Pacific Islands Cooperative Botanic Studies Institute)

 
Manua